Sophia Aliberti is a Greek talk show and game show host since 2004, television actress and former fashion model.

Filmography
Ta Tsakalia: Ena koinoniko provlima,  1981 .... Athina FotiadouGarsoniera gia deka 1981Apenanti, Oi 1981Vasika... kalispera sas 1982 .... LilianStrofi, I 1982 .... StefiKamikazi, agapi mou 1983 .... Sofia PaskhalidiEpikindynoi (Mia diamartyria), Oi 1983Thilyko thiriotrofeio 1983Rakos... No. 14, kai o protos bounakias 1985 .... Sophia PaskhalidiSkiahtra, I 1985Tile-kannivaloi 1987 .... MarinaLordan, o varvaros 1987 .... VarvaraPaidia tis Helidonas, Ta 1987Goiteia tou hrimatos, I 1988M' agapas? 1989Ena atithaso koritsi'' 1989 .... Sophia

References

Living people
Greek television actresses

Greek female models
Year of birth missing (living people)
Mass media people from Athens
Actors from Corfu